No Place to Run is the eighth studio album by English rock band UFO, released in January 1980 by Chrysalis Records. It was the band's first to feature Paul Chapman, who replaced Michael Schenker on lead guitar.

The album was produced by George Martin, best known for his work with The Beatles. The album cover appeared in different varieties in the UK, although the only difference was the colour of the title. The album yielded two singles: "Young Blood" and "Lettin' Go".

"At the time, I thought No Place to Run sounded a bit flat with George Martin's mix", remarked Chapman in 2009, when a remastered version was released, with an expanded booklet and bonus tracks. "And I still do, kind of, but it's nowhere near as flat as I first thought."

Track listing

Personnel 
UFO
Phil Mogg – vocals
Paul Chapman – lead guitar
Paul Raymond – keyboards, rhythm guitar, backing vocals
Pete Way – bass
Andy Parker – drums

Production
George Martin – producer, mixing
Geoff Emerick – engineer, mixing
Steve Churchyard – assistant engineer
John Wall – tape operator (Montserrat)
Nigel Walker – tape operator (London)

Charts

Certifications

References

UFO (band) albums
1980 albums
Albums produced by George Martin
Chrysalis Records albums
Albums with cover art by Hipgnosis
Albums recorded at AIR Studios